Information and Communications Technology Academy, better known as iAcademy (stylized as iACADEMY) is a private, non-sectarian educational institution in the Philippines. The college offers specialized senior high school and undergraduate programs in fields relating to computer science, game development, multimedia arts, animation, and business management.

The college has three campuses: Buendia Campus and iACADEMY Nexus in Yakal, which are both in the Makati Central Business District, and the Cebu Campus, which was formally inaugurated in 2023.

History
Founded in 2002, iACADEMY offers specialized degree programs in BS computer science with specialization in software engineering, BS computer science with specialization in cloud computing specialization track in partnership with Amazon Web Services, BS computer science with specialization in data science specialization track, BS information technology with specialization in web development, BS Bachelor of Science in entertainment and multimedia computing game development, BS business administration with specialization in marketing management, BS in accountancy, BS in real estate management, BA in psychology, BA fashion design and technology, BA multimedia arts and design,  BS in animation, BA in film and visual effects, and in 2007 iACADEMY was granted permission by the Commission on Higher Education, to offer the first Bachelor of Science animation program in the Philippines. is the one of the first college institutions in the Philippines offering BS Animation. iACADEMY's School of Continuing Education offers similar short courses aimed at working professionals.

iACADEMY uses an industry-aligned curriculum in its degree programs that is focused in computing, business, and design. The four-year programs culminate in a six-month, 960-hour internship program that the students have to go through before graduating.

By 2014, iACADEMY moved to a new and bigger campus in Buendia to house its growing student population. On the same year, iACADEMY signed a Memorandum of Understanding with Aboitiz Weather Philippines to develop a website and application for a faster and more user-friendly experience on weather reports.

iACADEMY was also able to lock down a study tour partnership with Polimoda, Italy's leading school of Fashion and Marketing, as well as a transfer program with De Paul University in Chicago, U.S. The school also, together with the Animation Council of the Philippines (ACPI) also hosted the Animahenasyon 2014, the biggest Animation Festival in the Philippines, drawing thousands of students and professionals to the event.

In 2018, due to its growing population, iACADEMY opens its second campus, iACADEMY Nexus, on Yakal Street, Makati.

Milestones and Partnerships 

2002 -  iACADEMY was established to reinvent education

2009 - iACADEMY became an Authorized Training Partner of Wacom, a Japanese company that produces graphics tablets and related products.It was also designated as the first IBM Center of Excellence in the ASEAN region.

2010 -  iACADEMY partnered with Runway Philippines Season 3 & 4. iACADEMY also partnered with TV5 during the first automated elections in the Philippines. Together with DZRH Manila Broadcasting Radio, Manila Broadcasting Company (MBC), Legal Network for Truthful Elections (LENTE), Stratbase, Inc. Public Affairs and Research Consultancy Group, ePLDT, Inc., and Social Weather Stations (SWS), they worked to bring up-to-date election coverage. In the same year, the college was appointed the first IBM Software Center of Excellence in the ASEAN Region and the first Lotus Academic Institute.

2011 - iACADEMY was chosen by Solar Entertainment Corporation to be the official partner-school and workspace of the third season of Project Runway Philippines. In 2019, the school becomes the first and only Toon Boom Center of Excellence in Asia.

2015 - iACADEMY held the first 24-hour game competition called Battle League.

2016 - iACADEMY began offering specialized Senior High School programs. 

2017 - iACADEMY began providing training and certification with UNITY, as a Certified Training and Certification Partner. It also became the official partner of the International Game Developers Association in hosting Manila Game Jam 2017 as part of the Global Game Jam in January 2017.

2018 - iACADEMY has been chosen by Amazon Web Services (AWS) as the first and only school in the Philippines to offer Cloud Computing Certification Courses. Amazon Web Services (AWS) declared iACADEMY as their first educational partner.

2019 - iACADEMY partnered with PricewaterhouseCoopers for the Accountancy program under the School of Business and Liberal Arts. iACADEMY was also recognized as the first and only Toon Boom Center of Excellence in Asia, the leading supplier of animation software and storyboard software for animation studios and media publishers.

iACADEMY and PythonPH partnered in hosting PyCon APAC 2019, the largest gathering of Python developers in the Asia-Pacific region. 

iACADEMY became the first educational institution partner of the Department of Tourism (DOT), and developed a mobile application that houses the travel website of the Philippines, augmented reality promotional materials, films featuring the provinces and the Philippines’ first social distancing app called "Maze".

iACADEMY formed a partnership with Museo ng Kaalamáng Katutubò (MusKKat) where students contributed to the development of MusKKat's marketing plans, promotional and computing materials to raise awareness on the notable Philippine indigenous artifacts. 

It also sealed a partnership with Unilab in October 2019 where college students are given the chance to come up with outputs aligned with improving the lives of Unilab's community partners and supporting Unilab's business objectives.

Same year, iACADEMY inked its partnership with the Climate Change Commission (CCC) in the promotion of a climate-resilient and climate-smart Philippines. CCC exhibited 30 of the students’ designs in CTRL+S Now: A Print Exhibition on Climate Change Awareness and Action during Climate Change Consciousness Week.

2020 - iACADEMY was pronounced as the first educational institution in the Philippines to implement the Alibaba Global Digital Talent program.

iACADEMY won the Most Innovative Education Provider award by the UK-based publications company Global Brands along with other top-tier schools including Harvard, Massachusetts Institute of Technology (MIT), and Nanyang Technological University.

iACADEMY was recognized by international publications for the following awards:

Global Brand Awards 2021 (UK): Most Innovative Education Provider, Most Innovative Design School, Best New School for Music Production & Technology in the Philippines; Global Business Review Magazine Awards 2021 (UAE): Most Innovative Education Provider, and Most Innovative Design School; International Business Magazine Awards 2021 (UAE): Most Innovative Education Provider, Most Innovative Design School, and Best New School for Music Production & Technology in the Philippines; World Economic Magazine Inc. Awards  2021 (US): Most Progressive Education Provider; World Business Outlook 2021: Most Innovative Education Provider in the Philippines, and Leading Computing, Business and Liberal Arts, and Design Education Provider in the Philippines.

In 2020, iACADEMY also established a partnership with Temasek Polytechnic in Singapore to keep students and faculty engaged and updated with the direction of various industries like business, technology, humanities, and design through exchange programs and other opportunities that will elevate learning.

iACADEMY launched its cutting edge program BA Music Production and Sound Design in partnership with industry experts Avid and Dolby Atmos.

2022 - iACADEMY x ASUS Edukasyon partnership was launched, in cooperation with the School of Business and Liberal Arts. iACADEMY was awarded Best Design School, Best School for Music Production, Design, and Technology, Best Education Provider, and Most Innovative Education Provider by Global Business Review Magazine (UAE).

Academics
The college offers four Senior High School tracks, offering ten programs, and three schools that offers ten undergraduate degree programs in computer sciences, business managements, and arts. These programs offered include fields mainly in arts, computer science, and business management.

SHS Strands 
There are four tracks that are being offered in iACADEMY. First is the Academic Track, which offers two strands in Accountancy Business and Management (ABM) and Humanities and Social Sciences (HUMSS), second is the Technical Vocational (Tech-Voc) Track, which offers four strands in Computer Programming (Software Development), Animation, Fashion Design, and Graphic Illustration, third is the Arts and Design Track offers two strands in Multimedia Arts and Audio Production, and last is the Science, Technology, Engineering, and Math (STEM) Track, which only offers Robotics as its strand.

School of Computing 
The School of Computing is the first IBM Center of Excellence (CoE) in the ASEAN region and the official Microsoft Training Center in the Philippines. The school offers three Bachelor of Science degrees in Computer Science (Software Engineering) with specialization in Software Engineering Specialization track, Cloud Computing Specialization Track in partnership with amazon Web Services, or Data Science Specialization track, Entertainment and Multimedia Computing (Game Development), and IT (Web Development).

School of Business and Liberal Arts 
The School of Business and Liberal Arts offers three Bachelor of Science degrees in business administration with specialization in marketing management, accountancy, real estate management, and one Bachelor of Arts degree in psychology.

School of Design 
The School of Design is the first to offer an animation program in the Philippines and the only Toon Boom Center of Excellence in Asia. It is also partnered with Wacom Authorized Training Partners to provide students with the latest technologies. The school offers a Bachelor of Science degree in animation and two Bachelor of Arts degrees in multimedia arts and design, fashion design and technology, film and visual effects, and music production, which began in the school year 2021–2022.

Student life 
The senior high school program follows the semester calendar which usually starts from August and ends in June, while the college follows a trimester calendar starting from July. New students are offered to join SOAR (Student Orientation and Registration), an event that is held a week before the start of classes, to introduce the students around the campus.

Traditions 
 SOAR (Student Orientation and Registration) - An event to orient new students to the school
 Creative Camp - Free art workshops
 Battle League - Gaming competition to promote the Game Development industry

Student organizations

Senior High School 
 Anime Habu
 Basic Integrated Theater Arts Guild of iACT (BiTAG)
 CTRL Dance Troupe
 iACADEMY Junior Software Developers (iJSD)
 iACADEMY Student Council (CS)
 Interactive Media and Gaming Guild
 Magnates - SHS Chapter
 OCTAVE - SHS Chapter
 Prima - SHS Chapter
 SiLAKBO
 Sining na Nakglilikha ng Buhay (SinLikHay)
 Student Athletes Society - SHS Chapter
 The Spines
 Vektor
 VELOCiTY - SHS Chapter
 Young Filmmakers Society of iACADEMY (YFS)

College 
 RHYTHM
 Creative Society
 Filmmakers Society of iACADEMY (FSi)
 iACADEMY Making Positive Action (iMPACT)
 iACADEMY Photography Society (Optics)
 iACADEMY Student Council (CSO)
 iACT
 International Games Developers Association of iACADEMY (IGDA)
 Magnates - College Chapter
 OCTAVE - College Chapter
 Pikzel Graphic Design
 Prima - College Chapter
 Software Engineering through Academics and Leadership (SEAL)
 Student Athletes Society - College Chapter
 The Game Changers Press (Official Student Publication)

References

External links
Official website

Art schools in the Philippines
Design schools
Information technology institutes
Educational institutions established in 2002
Universities and colleges in Makati
2002 establishments in the Philippines